The 1954–55 season was the 56th season of competitive league football in the history of English football club Wolverhampton Wanderers. They played in the First Division, then the highest level of English football, for a 17th consecutive year.

They entered the season as the defending league champions but were denied a second consecutive title by Chelsea, who finished four points ahead of them.

Results

Final League Table

Pld = Matches played; W = Matches won; D = Matches drawn; L = Matches lost; F = Goals for; A = Goals against; GA = Goal average; Pts = Points

FA Cup

FA Charity Shield

Players Used 

Bert Williams	39	4	1	44
Billy Wright	39	4	0	43
Peter Broadbent	38	4	1	43
Dennis Wilshaw	28	4	1	43
Bill Slater	38	4	0	42
Ron Flowers	37	4	1	42
Bill Shorthouse	36	4	1	41
Roy Swinbourne	36	4	1	41
Les Smith	34	4	0	38
Eddie Stuart	33	4	0	37
Johnny Hancocks	32	3	1	36
Jimmy Mullen	17	0	0	17
Eddie Clamp	10	0	1	11
George Showell	8	0	0	8
Norman Deeley	7	0	1	8
Roy Pritchard	7	0	0	7
Colin Booth	3	0	0	3
Nigel Sims	3	0	0	3
Jack Taylor	3	0	0	3
Peter Russell	2	0	1	3
Tommy McDonald	1	1	0	2
Joe Baillie	1	0	0	1
Bill Gutterirdge	0	0	1	1

References
General Stats
Results
Team Details

1954–55
Wolverhampton Wanderers F.C.